Nchelenge District is a district of Zambia, located in the Luapula Province. The capital lies at Nchelenge. As of the 2000 Zambian Census, the district had a population of 111,119 people.

Nchelenge is one of the twelve districts of Luapula Province in Zambia, second largest by population size (only next to the provincial capital, Mansa). Other districts being Mansa, Kawambwa, Milenge, Mwense, Chienge, Chembe, Chipili, Chifunabuli, Mwansabombwe, Lunga and Samfya. The district, located north of Luapula province some 250 km away from Mansa is the most densely populated of all the districts in the province at 45 persons per square kilometer. The district has a total surface area of 4.092square kilometers (60% land, 30% water and 10% swamps).  The district shares borders with Democratic Republic of the Congo in the west, Chienge District in the north, Kaputa District in the north-east and Kawambwa District in the south-east. Lake Mweru marks the boundary between Nchelenge and Congo DR.

Socio-economic profile

The native inhabitants of Nchelenge are mainly fishers or fishmongers. Due to overfishing, there has been a shift to farming in the past few years to meet people's basic economic needs.  The selling of fish and timber, as well as general trading, comprise the main economic activities carried out by people, accounting for some 80 percent of the workforce. The remaining 20 percent are formally employed workers mostly in government departments and various non-governmental organizations in the area. The transport sector in the district has also increased.

Banking services are offered by the National Savings Bank and the Zambia National Commercial Bank; the latter operating as a mobile bank twice weekly from Kawambwa district, located about 90 kilometers from Nchelenge district.

Education services

The district has 51 government primary schools, four day secondary schools, one boarding secondary school, five private schools and one nursing school. with the coming in of over 12,000 refugees from the Democratic Republic of Congo into the district, two new additional schools (one primary and one combined primary & secondary school) have been constructed and commissioned for both the refugee and host communities. The literacy level is low, with only thirty percent of the population completing primary education, forty percent attaining the ninth grade, and only ten percent completing the twelfth grade. The remaining twenty percent of the population does not attend school at all. Seventy percent of all students are male, and female students who drop out generally marry young, while male drop-outs tend to pursue careers in the fishing industry. These factors have had a negative impact on the developmental and economic advancements of the district.

Road network
The district is linked to Mansa (the provincial capital) by a paved road as far as St. Paul Hospital. All other roads are unpaved, which renders them impassable during the rainy season.

Water transport
Lake Mweru links Zambia with the Democratic Republic of Congo, and also with four islands: Kilwa, Chisenga, Isokwe and Kanakashi. Large vessels (ichombos) and smaller boats are used to transport traders and consumer goods on the lake as well as along the Luapula River. More modern boats to improve water transport in this area.

The mobile hospital unit in the district has two new boats. A passenger and an ambulance boat were added to its fleet, thus improving water transport and accessibility of health services for the island's population. The cost of fuel is the largest expense, which limits the economic practicality of this type of transportation.

Communication
The district is connected by phone and internet facilities. All the health facilities use cell phones, because all facilities have no functioning radios. Postal services are also available. The communication system in the district is fairly good with reliable television and radio reception.

Air transport
The district has one airport for light aircraft situated just 6 kilometers (3.7 miles) from the district central location. The aerodrome is located just 600m east of St. Paul's General Hospital. At 900meters long, the facility's runway is the best in the province, only second to the one in Mansa, the provincial capital.

Energy
The district is connected to the national grid up to Mukwakwa and 10 percent of the households have access to electrical power for lighting and cooking purposes. The rest of the district uses solar power, charcoal, or firewood as alternative sources of energy.

Governance

The Nchelenge district is headed by the District Commissioner on the administrative side appointed by the President. He/she is assisted by the district administrative office and heads of government departments who report to him administratively and to their provincial heads on technical matters. The Council Chairperson is an elected political leader responsible for the performance of civic duties in the district. He/She is elected every five (5) years by residents in all the wards of the district to preside over the political affairs of the district. Traditional leaders play an important governance role in the running of the district, which has four chiefs: Chief Kambwali, Chieftainess Kanyembo, Chief Nshimba and Chief Muyembe. Other traditional leaders include headmen and women who assist the chiefs.

References

Districts of Luapula Province